Jack MacDougall (born 1953) is a former politician in New Brunswick, Canada.

He was owner-operator of a taxi business in Saint John, New Brunswick which he sold prior to 1982.  In 1982, he led a 1-year, $1 million fundraising campaign to save the Imperial Theatre. He worked for the Liberal Party of New Brunswick from 1984 to 1999.  In 2002, he was an unsuccessful candidate for leader of the party. In August 2008, he was hired by the Green Party of Canada as Maritimes Organizer.

On September 24, 2009, MacDougall was acclaimed the leader of the Green Party of New Brunswick. In the 2010 general election, the Green Party polled 4.5 per cent of the vote and elected no members. In his own riding of Fredericton-Nashwaaksis, MacDougall finished third with 9.4 per cent of the vote. He resigned as leader on September 12, 2011.

He received an award "for breaking the mold" for his work in saving the Imperial Theatre in 2013.

See also 
List of Green party leaders in Canada

References

Living people
Leaders of the Green Party of New Brunswick
New Brunswick Liberal Association politicians
1953 births